Sebastian Richard Edward Cuthbert James (born 11 March 1966) is a British businessman,  who was formerly CEO of Dixons Carphone, and is the current CEO of Boots UK.

Early life
The son of Christopher James, 5th Baron Northbourne, he was educated at Eton College and Magdalen College, Oxford, where he was a member of the Bullingdon Club with former Conservative Prime Minister David Cameron, and Boris Johnson. He is a family friend of David Cameron and Helena Bonham-Carter. The two were on holiday together in Italy in August 2011 when Cameron had to return to deal with the London riots. James was given a job in government on 5 July 2010, by Education Secretary Michael Gove, reviewing state school spending. He earned an MBA from INSEAD in 1991.

Career
James started his career at Bain & Co, including being project leader with focus on retail and investment banking systems and transaction management. He was the chief executive of Synergy Insurance Services Limited, and strategy director responsible for developing and implementing the turnaround strategy at Mothercare.

He joined Dixons Retail in 2008 as development director managing its Currys transformation programme, becoming group CEO in 2012.

James was appointed CEO of Dixons Carphone in August 2014 following the merger of Dixons Retail with Carphone Warehouse. He was recognised as the mobile industry person of the year for his achievements with the merger.

In January 2018, James resigned as CEO of Dixons Carphone, to run Boots UK, "in a surprise move days before it updates the City on its Christmas trading performance", and was succeeded by Alex Baldock, who had been CEO of the online retailer Shop Direct since 2012.

James is a non-executive director of Direct Line Insurance Group plc, and was a trustee of the charities Save the Children and Techknowledge for Schools.

Since September 2018, James has been a senior vice president of Walgreens Boots Alliance, and president and managing director of Boots.

Personal life

James married Anna Gregory in August 1998, and they have four children.

References

1966 births
Alumni of Magdalen College, Oxford
British people of American descent
British people of French descent
British people of Greek descent
British retail chief executives
Bullingdon Club members
INSEAD alumni
Living people
People educated at Eton College
Walgreens people
Younger sons of barons